Constantin Lissenko (born 12 September 1933) is a French former sprinter who competed in the 1956 Summer Olympics.

References

1933 births
Living people
Olympic athletes of France
Athletes (track and field) at the 1956 Summer Olympics
French male sprinters